"The Elfin Knight" is a traditional Scottish folk ballad of which there are many versions, all dealing with supernatural occurrences, and the commission to perform impossible tasks. The ballad has been collected in different parts of England, Scotland, Ireland, the US, and Canada. As is the case with most traditional folk songs, there have been countless completely different versions recorded of the same ballad. The first broadside version was printed before 1674, and the roots of the song may be considerably older.

Synopsis
In the oldest extant version of this ballad (circa 1600-1650), an elf threatens to abduct a young woman to be his lover unless she can perform an impossible task. She responds with a list of tasks which he must first perform, thus evading rape. The plot is closely related to "Riddles Wisely Expounded" (Child Ballad #1), in which the Devil proposes to carry off a woman unless she can answer a number of riddles.

Later versions invert the direction of desire, with the elf proposing tasks which the lady must perform in order to be accepted as his lover. The first verse usually opens with the introduction of the title character:

(Note that this verse appears to be taken directly from "Lady Isabel and the Elf-Knight", Child Ballad #4; in this ballad, the horn is magic and arouses desire in the hearer.)

Meanwhile, a maid lies in bed, wishing she could marry the knight. Upon her speaking these words, the knight appears, telling her he will marry her if she will perform numerous tasks, all impossible.

She promptly responds with her own list of impossible tasks, and thereby gains her supernatural husband.

'The Fairy Knight'
 
Buchan's Ballads of the North of Scotland, II, 296.

Commentary
The countering of impossible tasks with other impossible tasks is a common motif in the folktale Aarne–Thompson type 875, the Clever Girl, a fairy tale making use of this motif is The Wise Little Girl.

In Celtic folklore, in common with many other European traditions, impossible tasks are often given to a suitor as part of a wedding trial  - a well known example would be Culhwch and Olwen from Welsh Brittonic tradition where the 40 impossible tasks are set by the father-in-law (in this case the giant Ysbadadden Pen Cawr).

Variants, including "Scarborough Fair"
This ballad was one of 25 traditional works included in Ballads Weird and Wonderful which was published by John Lane's The Bodley Head in 1912 and illustrated by Vernon Hill.

The song "Scarborough Fair" is considered a relatively recent variant of "The Elfin Knight", and both are officially classified as the same ballad. Mark Anderson (1874-1953), a retired lead-miner from either Newbiggin-by-the-Sea or Middleton-in-Teesdale, County Durham, England, sang "Scarborough Fair" to Ewan MacColl in 1947. Martin Carthy learnt the song from MacColl's songbook, and included it on his eponymous debut album in 1965. He taught the song to Paul Simon the same year, and Simon & Garfunkel released their own version, which was hugely successful. Prior to this, Bob Dylan used Martin Carthy's version as the basis of his song "Girl from the North Country" from his second album The Freewheelin' Bob Dylan (1963).

A similar variant is "Whittingham Fair", a song that was popular in the north and west of Northumberland, not far from Mark Anderson's County Durham. There are also several American variants, which differ greatly, among them "My Father Had an Acre of Land", "The Parsley Vine", and "The Shirt of Lace". Several recent Scottish recordings have preserved the "blaw winds blaw" refrain from the earliest written versions of the ballad.

A novel by Nancy Werlin, Impossible (Penguin/Dial, 2008), was inspired by the song.

Recordings

Following are some of the notable recordings of the ballad, including the artists, titles, albums, and years:

See also
List of the Child Ballads
The Fause Knight Upon the Road

References and notes

Further reading
 "American Versions of the Ballad of the Elfin Knight." The Journal of American Folklore 7, no. 26 (1894): 228-32. doi:10.2307/532838.
 Niles, John Jacob, Ron Pen, and WILLIAM BARSS. "The Elfin Knight (Child No. 2)." In The Ballad Book of John Jacob Niles, 11-20. Lexington, Kentucky: University Press of Kentucky, 2000. doi:10.2307/j.ctt130jnj1.7.

External links

"Scottish Ballads Online" Child Ballad #2: 'The Elfin Knight  With 13 variants from Francis J Child's collection and a further 8 from the appendix and a link to versions from the living tradition.
"My Father Had an Acre of Lan" melody and lyrics at folkinfo.org
"The Elfin Knight" at the Vaughan Williams Memorial Library
"The Elfin Knight" by BOANN on YouTube

Traditional ballads
Child Ballads
Scottish folk songs
Border ballads
Northumbrian folklore
Northumbrian folkloric beings
Elves
Year of song unknown
ATU 850-999